Hazrat Kalianwala also spell as Hazrat Kailianwala, is a town and Union Council in Wazirabad Tehsil, Gujranwala District, Punjab, Pakistan, About 30 km north west of the village lies the Head Qadirabad Barrage and Channi Ghulla Bhoon

See also

 Gujranwala
 Wazirabad

References

Cities and towns in Gujranwala District
Populated places in Wazirabad Tehsil
Union councils of Wazirabad Tehsil